The Copa del Rey 1907 was the 5th staging of the Copa del Rey, the Spanish football cup competition.

The competition started on 24 March 1907, and concluded on 30 March 1907, with the Final Playoff, in which Madrid FC lifted the trophy for the third time in a row after beating Club Vizcaya 1–0 with a goal from Manuel Prast.

Participants
The tournament reached a new record for clubs participating. 

Eleven teams registered to participate: FC Barcelona, Moderno of Guadalajara, Recreativo de Huelva, San Sebastián Recreation Club, Athletic de Madrid, Excelsior of Madrid, Hispania of Madrid, Madrid FC, Club Bizcaya (merger of Athletic Bilbao and Unión Atlética Vizcaína), Hamilton FC of Salamanca and Vigo FC. While the Catalan regional champion X Sporting Club was invited, but again declined to participate due to internal dissent and excessive travel costs.

Of these eleven teams, FC Barcelona and San Sebastian RC withdrew before the draw, while  Moderno Guadalajara had their entry rejected by the organizers. Under the rules of the time, the four teams from Madrid had to play a preliminary competition to choose one representative: Madrid FC won this competition to qualify.

Thus, five teams took part in the main tournament:
 Recreativo de Huelva
 Madrid FC
 Club Vizcaya
 Hamilton FC
 Vigo FC

Group stage

Final

At the conclusion of the round-robin tournament, Madrid FC and Club Vizcaya finished level on points; therefore, a playoff  match to determine the champion was required.

References

External links
 linguasport.com
RSSSF.com
IFFHS.de

1907
1907 domestic association football cups
1906–07 in Spanish football